TER Champagne Ardenne was the regional rail network serving the former Champagne-Ardenne région of France. In 2016 it was merged into the new TER Grand Est.

TER Network

Rail

Bus 
 Châlons-en-Champagne – Vitry-le-François
 Château-Thierry – Montmirail – Esternay – Sézanne
 Chaumont – Clairvaux
 Culmont–Chalindrey – Gray
 Liart – Laon
 Sedan – Carignan – La Ferté-sur-Chiers
 Troyes – Laroche-Migennes
 Ville-sous-la-Ferté – Bar-sur-Aube – Vendeuvre 
 Troyes – Châlons-en-Champagne – Reims – Charleville-Mézières (provided by TransChampagneArdenne and not TER Champagne-Ardenne)

Rolling stock

Multiple units 
 SNCF Class Z 11500
 SNCF Class X 4300
 SNCF Class X 72500
 SNCF Class X 73500
 SNCF Class X 76500 (Also called: XGC 76500)
 SNCF Class B 81500 (Also called: BGC B 81500)

Locomotives 
 BB 16500
 BB 66400

In Order 
 SNCF Class Z 27500 (Also called: ZGC Z 27500)

See also 
SNCF
Transport express régional
Réseau Ferré de France
List of SNCF stations in Champagne-Ardenne
Champagne-Ardenne

External links 
 Official TER Champagne-Ardenne website

 
TER